The Pungdeokcheon, a tributary of the Tancheon, is a stream in Suji-gu in the city of Yongin, Gyeonggi-do.  It joins the Tancheon from the west in Jukjeon.

See also
Rivers of Korea
Geography of South Korea

Rivers of South Korea